Content in this edit is translated from the existing Spanish Wikipedia article at Lenka Franulic; see its history for attribution.

Lenka Franulic (1908–1961) was a Chilean journalist. She was the first Chilean woman to be formally recognised as a journalist.

Works

Publications
In 1939, Franulic published her first book, "One Hundred Contemporary Artists", with portraits of prominent writers of the time. 
In 1943, she published the "Anthology of the American Short Story." 
She wrote one short story, "Two Cents of Violets", the only one that has been found.

Translations
"Kitty Foyle" by Christopher Morley 
"Boarding School" by Christa Winsloe
"Harvey" by Mary Chase
"The Waves" and "Intermission" by Virginia Woolf
"Joseph Provider" by Thomas Mann
"Has the Moon" by John Steinbeck
"Charley's Aunt" by Brandon Thomas
"The Lovers Terribles" and "Mischievous Spirit" by Noël Coward

References 

1908 births
1961 deaths
Chilean women journalists
University of Chile alumni
Chilean people of Croatian descent
People from Antofagasta
20th-century Chilean women writers